"Eye for an Eye" is the first single by heavy metal band Soulfly, released in 1998. The song is the first track of the debut album Soulfly. However, "Eye for an Eye" is the tenth single written by Max Cavalera overall. His last single was Sepultura's "Ratamahatta" before he left the band and formed Soulfly. It has become Soulfly's trademark song, and is used at the closing of every Soulfly show since 1998.

The first Soulfly song features Fear Factory members Dino Cazares and Burton C. Bell as guests and plays fast, groovy riff lasting over 3½ minutes.

Track listing

Promo single

Cassette promo single

Personnel

Soulfly
Max Cavalera – vocals, rhythm guitar
Jackson Bandeira – lead guitar
Marcello D. Rapp – bass
Roy "Rata" Moyorga – drums

Additional personnel
Dino Cazares – rhythm guitar
Burton C. Bell – vocals
Jorge Du Peixe – percussion
Gilmar Bolla Oito – percussion

Produced by Ross Robinson
Mixed by Andy Wallace
Designed by Modino Graphics
Photographed by Glen La Ferman

References

External links 
 Song Lyrics

Soulfly songs
Roadrunner Records singles
1998 songs
Songs written by Max Cavalera
1998 debut singles